Love's Ups and Downs is the seventh solo studio album by American country singer Barbara Mandrell, released in November 1977.

This was Mandrell's second album released in 1977. The previous album released two singles, one of which was a Top 5 hit. This album also released two singles. Both singles became Top 10 hits on the Billboard Country charts, the first time Mandrell had two solo Top 10 hits in a row. The first single, "Woman to Woman" peaked in the Top 5 and was a major hit that year. The song also marked the first time one of Mandrell's singles peaked inside the Billboard Hot 100, only peaking at #92. It also was the first time one of Mandrell's songs reached the Adult Contemporary charts, but again, it was not a major hit, only reaching the Top 50. The second single, "Tonight" was another Top 5 hit, but did not chart on the Hot 100 or Adult Contemporary charts. The album as a whole was not a major success, only peaking at #29 on the Top Country Albums chart.

The album included cover versions of some songs, including a remake of Jackie Wilson's,  "(Your Love Has Lifted Me) Higher and Higher", which had been a pop hit for Rita Coolidge that same year, and "How Long," originally recorded by Ace. "Woman to Woman" was a cover of Shirley Brown's #1 R&B hit from 1974. The album consisted of 10 tracks, some of which were new songs.

Track listing
"(Your Love Has Lifted Me) Higher and Higher" (Gary Jackson, Carl Smith)
"Don't Hand Me No Hand-Me-Down Love" (Charles Silver, Rory Michael Bourke)
"If I Were a River" (Marty Yonts)
"The Magician" (Kent Robbins)
"Woman to Woman" (Homer Banks,  Eddie Marion, Henderson Thigpen)
"Tonight" (Rafe Van Hoy, Don Cook)
"Let the Rain Out" (Geoffrey Morgan)
"A Fancy Place to Cry" (John Schweers)
"Walking Home in the Rain" (Paul Craft)
"How Long" (Paul Carrack)

Personnel
Barbara Mandrell - lead vocals
Lea Jane Berinati, Tom Brannon, Dorothy Deleonibus, Janie Fricke, Ginger Holladay, The Jordanaires, Sherilyn Kramer, Duane West - backing vocals
Mike Leech - bass guitar
Hayward Bishop, Kenny Malone - drums
Tommy Williams - fiddle
Pete Bordonali, Jimmy Capps, Steve Gibson, Glenn Keener, Billy Sanford, Bobby Thompson, Chip Young, Reggie Young - guitar
Charlie McCoy - harmonica
Charlie McCoy, Farrell Morris - percussion
David Briggs, Tony Migliore, Bobby Ogdin, Hargus "Pig" Robbins - piano
John Hughey, Hal Rugg - steel guitar
George Binkley III, Marvin Chantry, Roy Christensen, Carl Gorodetzky, Sheldon Kurland, Wilfred Lehmann, Steven Smith, Gary Vanosdale, Stephanie Woolf - strings
Archie Jordan - string arrangements (tracks 1,5,6,10)
Charlie McCoy, Farrell Morris - vibraphone

Charts
Album – Billboard (North America)

Singles – Billboard (North America)

1977 albums
Barbara Mandrell albums
Dot Records albums
Albums produced by Tom Collins (record producer)